Ognishchevo is a rural locality (a selo) in Shebekinsky District, Belgorod Oblast, Russia. The population was 27 as of 2010.

Geography 
Ognishchevo is located 25 km northeast of Shebekino (the district's administrative centre) by road. Starovshchina is the nearest rural locality.

References 

Rural localities in Shebekinsky District